Oryctodromeus (meaning "digging runner") was a genus of small orodromine thescelosaurid dinosaur. Fossils are known from the Late Cretaceous Blackleaf Formation of southwestern Montana and the Wayan Formation of southeastern Idaho, USA, both of the Cenomanian stage, roughly 95 million years ago. A member of the small, presumably fast-running herbivorous family Thescelosauridae, Oryctodromeus is the first non-avian dinosaur published that shows evidence of burrowing behavior.

Description
 
Oryctodromeus was originally described as lacking ossified tendons in the tail. However, specimens from the Wayan Formation demonstrate the presence of a thick tendon lattice in the dorsal, sacral, and caudal columns of some specimens; perhaps indicating more flexibility in ossified tendons than has previously been supposed. Adaptations in the jaws, forelimbs, and pelvis were described in the Blackleaf specimens that could have helped move and manipulate soil.

The authors pointed out that Oryctodromeus had only modest forelimb modifications in comparison to dedicated burrowing animals, like moles, echidnas, and wombats. Instead, it was comparable to, but somewhat more specialized for digging than animals that both run and burrow today, like aardwolves, cavies, hyenas, and rabbits. Because it was a biped, it could have a more modified forelimb without affecting its ability to run.

Discovery

Oryctodromeus is based on specimens from the Blackleaf Formation: MOR 1636a, a partial skeleton of an adult individual including: the premaxillae (upper beak); part of the braincase; three neck, six back, seven hip, and twenty-three tail vertebrae; ribs; the shoulder girdle; an arm (minus the hand); both tibiae and an incomplete fibula; and a metatarsal. Two additional individuals, both juveniles about 55 to 65% the size of MOR 1636a, are represented by MOR 1636b. Numerous additional partial skeletons are known from the Wayan Formation.

Classification

Under a cladistic analysis, Oryctodromeus was found to be basal within Euornithopoda and a close relative of the hypsilophodonts Orodromeus and Zephyrosaurus, which are also known from the Cretaceous of Montana. These two animals share adaptations with Oryctodromeus that may have been used for burrowing, such as a broad snout. Additionally, Orodromeus specimens have been found preserved in a similar way, suggesting that they too were in burrows. This would not be the first time that a hypsilophodont has been suggested as a burrower; Robert Bakker has informally claimed since the 1990s that Drinker, from the late Jurassic of Wyoming, lived in burrows, but this has yet to be published.

Paleobiology
As a basal ornithopod, Oryctodromeus would have been a small, swift herbivore. This aspect, coupled with where it was discovered, gives it its name: Oryctodromeus cubicularis translates as "digging runner of the lair", in reference to its presumed lifestyle. The presence of juveniles with the adult suggests parental care, and that at least one motivation for burrowing was to rear the juveniles. The size of the juveniles suggests an extended period of parental care.

Burrowing behavior
 
The skeletons were densely packed and disarticulated, indicating that the animals died and decayed within the burrow. The burrow is similar to those made by hyenas and puffins today. It was filled with sand, and the resulting sandstone stands out against the surrounding mudstone and claystone.

There are two turns in the preserved burrow section, and smaller secondary sandstone cylinders of various sizes (a few centimeters or inches in cross-section at most) that were probably made by smaller animals sharing the burrow (commensal). The burrow closely fits the probable proportions of the adult dinosaur, another indication that it was the digger.

References

External links
 Dinosaur den diggers discovered - BBC
  Dinosauriweb about the Oryctodromeus 
 Full abstract of description
 Article about burrowing dinosaurs from The Cambrian Explosion blog

Late Cretaceous dinosaurs of North America
Fossil taxa described in 2007
Taxa named by Anthony J. Martin
Paleontology in Montana
Paleontology in Idaho
Cenomanian genus first appearances
Cenomanian genus extinctions
Ornithischian genera